PHD or PhD may refer to:

 Doctor of Philosophy (PhD), an academic qualification

Entertainment
 PhD: Phantasy Degree, a Korean comic series
 Piled Higher and Deeper, a web comic
 Ph.D. (band), a 1980s British group
Ph.D. (Ph.D. album)
Ph.D. (Art Farmer album)
 "PHD", a song on the album Tweekend by the Crystal Method

Science and technology
 PHD finger, a protein sequence
 Enzymes  PHD1,  PHD2 and  PHD3

Locations
 Naval Surface Warfare Center, Port Hueneme Division, Port Hueneme, California
 Harry Clever Field, a small, public general aviation airport in New Philadelphia, Ohio